ε-Amanitin (epsilon-Amanitin) is a cyclic peptide. It is an amatoxin, all of which are found in several members of the mushroom genus Amanita. The oral  of ε-amanitin is approximately 0.1 mg/kg.

Toxicology 

Like other amatoxins, ε-amanitin is an inhibitor of RNA polymerase II. Upon ingestion, it binds to the RNA polymerase II enzyme which completely prevents mRNA synthesis, effectively causing cytolysis of hepatocytes (liver cells) and kidney cells.

See also 
 Mushroom poisoning

References

External links 
Amatoxins REVISED 
Poisonous Mushrooms (German)

Cyclic peptides
Amatoxins
Hepatotoxins
Tryptamines